TJO may refer to:

 Theodore Jacobsen Observatory, an observatory at the University of Washington, Seattle, USA
 Tara Jane O'Neil, a musician